"Haunting Me" or "Haunting Me (All of the Time)" is a song recorded by Australian new wave band, V Capri. It was co-written by band members, Tod Johnston and Lance Karapetcoff, and produced by Kevin Beamish, which released in August 1985 as the second single ahead of the band's debut studio album, In My World (October 1986). It peaked in the Kent Music Report singles chart top 50.

The song was released in Europe in 1989 following its usage in the Australian television soap opera, Neighbours.

Track listing

 Australian 7" single (K-9798)
Side A "Haunting Me" – 4:18
Side B "A Year from Now" – 3:58

 European 7" single (DOLE 10 /PWLT 28)
Side A "Haunting Me" (extended version) – 4:44
Side B "A Year from Now" – 3:58

Charts

References

1985 songs
1985 singles
1989 singles
Mushroom Records singles